Morbi or Morvi is a city known as a ceramics capital of India is in the Morbi district in the state of Gujarat, India. It is situated on the Kathiawar peninsula. , the city's population was determined to be 194,947.

Etymology
The district is named after Morbi city. The name of the city of Morbi (literally meaning the city of peacocks) was probably derived from the King of Bhuj.

History
It’s called once as Morvi, There were rivers of Milk and Ghee(Butter). This means Morbi was too prosperous. On that time Morbi was among the Strongest states of India. Morbi Was ruled by many Kingdom. From the Mughal Empire to Rajputs and Britishers. From Qutb-ud-din Aybak to Lakhdhirji Thakor… Sir Waghjee Thakor

After the death of Waghjee Thakor, Prince Lakhdhirji Thakor announced the King of Morbi. He also did a remarkable job in the History of Morbi. In his time Electric powerhouse and Telephone exchange was built. He also built Temples, Technical High School and Engineering college. This college is now known as the name of ‘L.E.College’.

In 1947, India became independent and Morbi had been associated with India. So this was the talk of old Morbi and It’s kingdom. After that Modern Morbi come into existence. Morbi started to grow on all sides. Right now Morbi is the hub of the Ceramic and Wall clock industries. With near about 390 Ceramic and 150 Wall clocks industries, Morbi has its own special place among Indian Industries.

There are always some disasters associated with any city or place. Morbi was getting success over success. But suddenly it got two breaks over it. Yes, Morbi has been survived from 2 biggest disasters. Even the world has noticed these disasters. In 1979, Burst of Macchu – 2 Dam and in 2000, Biggest earthquake of Indian history.

Temples

References

Morbi district